The 1959 football season was São Paulo's 30th season since club's existence.

Overall

{|class="wikitable"
|-
|Games played || 78 (9 Torneio Rio-São Paulo, 38 Campeonato Paulista, 31 Friendly match)
|-
|Games won || 41 (4 Torneio Rio-São Paulo, 22 Campeonato Paulista, 15 Friendly match)
|-
|Games drawn || 20 (2 Torneio Rio-São Paulo, 9 Campeonato Paulista, 9 Friendly match)
|-
|Games lost || 17 (3 Torneio Rio-São Paulo, 7 Campeonato Paulista, 7 Friendly match)
|-
|Goals scored || 160
|-
|Goals conceded || 101
|-
|Goal difference || +59
|-
|Best result || 6–0 (H) v Jabaquara - Campeonato Paulista - 1959.07.30
|-
|Worst result || 1–4 (A) v Santos - Friendly match - 1959.04.05
|-
|Most appearances || 
|-
|Top scorer || 
|-

Friendlies

Official competitions

Torneio Rio-São Paulo

Record

Campeonato Paulista

Record

External links
official website 

Association football clubs 1959 season
1959
1959 in Brazilian football